Archibald Hamilton Ramage Shaw (7 August 1922 – 1985) was a Scottish footballer who played for Motherwell. He also represented the Scottish League twice.

References

1922 births
1985 deaths
Date of death missing
Sportspeople from Wishaw
Scottish footballers
Association football fullbacks
Association football coaches
Motherwell F.C. players
Scottish Football League players
Scottish Football League representative players
Scottish Junior Football Association players
Wishaw Juniors F.C. players
Motherwell F.C. non-playing staff
Footballers from North Lanarkshire